The nine castles of the Knuckle are a group of ancient castles found in Aberdeenshire in the Buchan area of Scotland. The term was used by historian William Douglas Simpson, who described the promontory between the Moray Firth and the North Sea as "the north-eastern knuckle of Scotland". From west to east, the castles are Dundarg, Pitsligo, Pitullie, Kinnaird, Wine Tower, Cairnbulg, Inverallochy, Lonmay and Rattray. Although Simpson coined the term, he did not draw any connections between the sites, other than their location.

References 

Castles in Aberdeenshire